Storvatnet is a lake in the municipality of Indre Fosen in Trøndelag county, Norway. It is the largest lake on the Fosen peninsula.

See also
List of lakes in Norway

References

Lakes of Trøndelag
Indre Fosen